The River Fergus is a river within the Shannon River Basin which flows in County Clare, Ireland. The river begins at Lough Fergus in north Clare and flows into the Shannon Estuary. The source is at Lough Fergus in the townland of Kilmore North. 

At Knockroe, the river is joined by a tributary stream called the Clooneen River. The Fergus flows underground for about a kilometre in Cahermacon, near Kilnaboy. The river then flows through Lough Inchiquin. Just after this lake, a tributary which has its source at Loughnagowan joins the Fergus. The river then flows along by the village of Corofin. After Corofin, the river flows through Lough Atedaun, Ballyteige Lough, Dromore Lake and Ballyallia Lake. The river then flows through the town of Ennis, where it is crossed by six road bridges, a pedestrian bridge and a railway bridge. There is also a small branch which splits off just north of Ennis and rejoins the main flow to the east of the town.  Another tributary, a stream known as the Inch River or Claureen River, also joins at Ennis. The river then flows through the village of Clarecastle, where there was a port in former times. After Clarecastle, the river widens into an estuary which then joins the Shannon Estuary. There are several islands in the Fergus Estuary, including Deer Island, Coney Island, Trummer Island, Inishmacowney, Canon Island and Inishloe. Some of these islands were once inhabited, and there were schools on Coney Island and Inishloe.

The River Fergus is noted for its trout and salmon fishing. A water-powered flour mill was located at Clifden, Corofin, just after the river exits Lough Inchiquin. Some of the ruins of the mill still exist. Another water mill was located in Ennis, and its mill wheel has been restored.

The River Fergus has an average discharge of 25.7 m3/s.

Name

The river's name is recorded in old Irish manuscripts as Forgas and Forgus. A possible derivation is from Old Irish for- ("on, upon") and gas, "stripling, twig, scion", with the Fergus seen as a twig or small branch off of the much larger River Shannon.

Settlements
Settlements along the river include Corofin, Ennis and Clarecastle.

See also
 Rivers of Ireland
 River Shannon
 Shannon River Basin

References

External links

Fergus